Guido Molinari  (October 12, 1933 – February 21, 2004) was a Canadian artist, known internationally for his serial abstract paintings.

Biography 
Molinari was born in Montreal, Quebec to Italian heritage with his parents from Cune (Borgo a Mozzano, Tuscany) and Naples, Campania. He began painting at age 13, and his existentialist approach to art was formed during a bout with tuberculosis at age 16, during which he read Nietzsche, Sartre, Piaget, and Camus. He studied at the École des beaux-arts de Montréal (1948-1950) and the Montreal Museum of Fine Arts (1951), studying with Marian Scott and Gordon Webber.

He practiced abstraction in New York, inspired by Barnett Newman, and Jackson Pollock, then returned to Montreal where he founded the Galerie L’Actuelle and helped create the Non-Figurative Artists Association. He married Fernande Saint-Martin in 1958. Throughout the 1960s, Molinari made works consisting of vertical bands of equal width placed on a flat picture plane. The National Gallery of Canada and the Vancouver Art Gallery each acquired a canvas from the Stripe series, as it is called, and one of the series was included in the important group exhibition The Responsive Eye held at the Museum of Modern Art in New York, along with works by artists such as Frank Stella. Works of the Stripe series by Molinari along with works by Ulysse Comtois represented Canada at the 1968 Venice Biennale. He won a Guggenheim Fellowship in 1967, was made an Officer of the Order of Canada in 1971, received the Victor Martyn Lynch-Staunton Award (1973) and won the Prix Paul-Émile-Borduas in 1980. He was a member of the Royal Canadian Academy of Arts.

His work is known for its focus on modular and contrasting colours, shapes, and lines. It was exhibited worldwide, including in shows at the National Gallery of Canada, the Musée d'art contemporain de Montréal (retrospective, 1995), in the Guggenheim Museum and the Museum of Modern Art in New York (The Responsive Eye, 1965).

He taught for 27 years at Sir George Williams University and Concordia University, and retired in 1997. In 2004, Concordia recognized him with a posthumous honorary doctorate.

An avid art collector, his extensive private collection included the work of Mondrian and the manuscript pages of Mondrian`s original defition of Neo-Plasticism (1926), Matisse, John Cage, Jasper Johns, and Quebec artists Denis Juneau, John Lyman, and Ozias Leduc. His obituary in the National Post quoted the then director of the Art Gallery of Ontario, Matthew Teitelbaum, as saying he owned Barnett Newman, Richard Serra, Francis Bacon, Piet Mondrian and Ellsworth Kelly.

Guido Molinari died of pneumonia after having bone cancer which migrated from his lungs.

Works 
 Mutation sérielle verte-rouge, 1966, acrylic on canvas, 205.7 x 248.9 cm
 Blue Quantifier #25

Record sale prices 
In a sale of 15 June 2022, Molinari's Série noir/blanc, acrylic on canvas, signed and dated “11/67” on the reverse, 81 x 68 ins ( 205.7 x 172.7 cms ), realized a price of $264,000.00.

Documentaries 

 Guido Molinari: The Colour of Memory

References 

1933 births
2004 deaths
20th-century Canadian painters
Canadian male painters
21st-century Canadian painters
Artists from Montreal
Canadian people of Italian descent
Members of the Royal Canadian Academy of Arts
Modern painters
Officers of the Order of Canada
École des beaux-arts de Montréal alumni
Canadian contemporary artists
20th-century Canadian male artists
21st-century Canadian male artists
Canadian abstract artists